Peter Oliva (born 1964), is a Canadian novelist who lives in Calgary, Alberta.

His first novel, Drowning in Darkness (1993–1999), won the Writers Guild of Alberta Best First Book Award and was shortlisted for a Bressani Prize.  The book is set in the Crowsnest Pass of southern Alberta, and in Calabria, Italy.  It follows Italian immigrants to Canada in the early 1900s.

A former bookseller, Oliva won the Canadian Bookseller's Association Award for best independent bookstore in Canada, in 1999.

His second novel, The City of Yes, won the 1999 Rogers Writers' Trust Fiction Prize.  The main narrative of a Canadian English teacher in Japan is interwoven with the fictionalized account of Ranald MacDonald, a Canadian explorer and the first man to teach English in Japan.

References

 Chaos as Metaphor: An Interview with Kazuo Ishiguro. By Peter Oliva, 1995, in: Brian W. Shaffer, Cynthia F. Wong ed., Conversations with Kazuo Ishiguro. Literary Conversations, 2008, pp 120–124

External links
 Peter Olivas Website
 Oliva, item at English-Canadian writers, Athabasca University, with links to a bibliography and an essay “Calabria to Crowsnest: Oliva’s Drowning in Darkness”, by Joseph Pivato

 

Canadian male novelists
Canadian people of Italian descent
1964 births
Living people
Writers from Calgary